Nomula may refer to places in India:

Nomula, Nalgonda, in Andhra Pradesh state
Nomula, Ranga Reddy, in Andhra Pradesh state